Natural areas in Tajikistan include:

Pamir National Park
Ramit State Nature Reserve
Tigrovaya Balka Nature Reserve
Zorkul Nature Reserve

Ramsar Convention (wetland) sites
Karakul (Tajikistan) (Lake)
Kayrakkum Reservoir
Panj River

See also
 :Category:Protected areas of Tajikistan